Claes Schaar (1920 – 2012) was a Swedish literary historian.

He studied at Lund University and took the doctorate in 1949 with the thesis Critical Studies in the Cynewulf Group. He later studied Chaucer and Shakespeare; later issuing Marino and Crashaw. ospetto d’Herode: A Commentary (1971) and The Full Voic’d Quire Below: Vertical Context Systems in Paradise Lost (1982). He was professor of English literature at Lund University from 1964 to 1986. He was a member of the Norwegian Academy of Science and Letters from 1988; also The Society of Sciences in Lund and the Royal Swedish Academy of Letters, History and Antiquities.

References

1920 births
2012 deaths
Swedish literary historians
Lund University alumni
Academic staff of Lund University
Members of the Norwegian Academy of Science and Letters